South Lake High School, commonly referred to as South Lake, is a high school located in Groveland, Florida, United States. It is one of eight public high schools in the Lake County School District, and is the second-largest high school in the district. Located in southern Lake County, the school serves Groveland, and parts of Clermont, Mascotte, and Minneola.

South Lake High was founded in 1993 by consolidating Clermont High School and Groveland High School. As of 2017, enrollment consists of around 2,000 students. It has approximately 120 certified teachers and 6 administrators. Its colors are blue and silver. The athletic teams, called the Eagles, are represented by a bald eagle.

Facility

The school structure was originally completed in Fall 1993 to educate around 1,800 students. The main building is a two-story structure, housing administrative offices, guidance offices, and approximately 40 classrooms. An additional two-floor structure was completed in 2007 to house core academic courses. It was originally built to house freshmen courses, but has since been converted to house multiple grades. Due to multiple campus updates and the addition of portable classrooms as of Summer 2011 it has a capacity of around 2,400.

The South Lake High campus has a library, a cafeteria, an auditorium, a band/chorus building, a gym containing a dance room, weight room, and a basketball/volleyball court, and three vocational buildings. One of these houses the culinary and JROTC program. This vocational building was converted from the original cafeteria. The campus also includes portables, six tennis courts, track, and football field and stadium.

Student body
South Lake High opened with approximately 1100 students, 700 from Clermont and 400 from Groveland. By 2009 the school had grown to around 2,200 students. At the inception of Lake Minneola High in Fall 2011 there was a reduction in the number of students to an expected 1,730. The school has since returned to around 2,000 students.

Screaming Eagle bands
The South Lake High School Band Program has been under the direction of Mr. Ryan F. Wright, since the summer of 2008. Since his time there, all facets of the program have consistently received Superior Ratings at Florida Bandmasters Association District and State Assessments. The program consists of The Screaming Eagle Regiment, Wind Symphony, Symphonic Band, Studio Jazz Ensemble, Jazz Lab Band, Jazz Combos, Percussion Ensembles, Woodwind Choir, Brass Choir, and the Cobalt Indoor Guard Ensemble. The program consists of over 120 students, who perform at festivals, competitions, community events, and concerts in the large SLHS Auditorium. The Screaming Eagle Band Program provides an opportunity for students to become lifelong learners through music and leadership instruction.  The band program partners with Innovative Percussion, Inc. and  Evans Drumheads. Since 2016, the school has founded The Music Institute at South Lake High School, offering an array of performance, technical, research, and leadership opportunities in the arts. In 2020 & 2021 respectively, Mr. Wright was nominated for the Grammy Foundation Music Educator of the Year Award, and ended up as a national quarterfinalist both years.

Clubs
Student Government
Band
Chorus
FBLA
FFA
Key Club
Creative Writing
Art
HOSA
Interact
FCA
National Honor Society.
Thespians
Gender and Sexualities Alliance
Environmental Club
HSCA
AICE

Notable alumni
 Jeff Demps - Running back for the Tampa Bay Buccaneers, and competed in the 4x100 men's relay in London 2012
 John Koronka - Former professional baseball player (Chicago Cubs, Texas Rangers, Florida Marlins)
 Roberto Aguayo - Kicker for the New England Patriots and 2013 Lou Groza Award winner
 Jonotthan Harrison - NFL player for the Indianapolis Colts

References

External links
Florida Department of Education
Lake County Schools
South Lake High
South Lake Bands

High schools in Lake County, Florida
Public high schools in Florida
Educational institutions established in 1993
1993 establishments in Florida